Dr James Burty David State Secondary School is a state secondary school based in Bell Village, Port Louis, Mauritius. Students are prepared for the School Certificate and the Higher School Certificate. The school was previously known as the Bell Village SSS.

History

James Burty David SSS was built in 2002 and was inaugurated by the Ministry of Education and the Honorable Mr. Rashid Beebeejaun among others. In the light of the educational reforms, with emphasis on regionalisation, a number of new state secondary schools were implanted across the island. JBDSSS, like many others new establishment became functional in January 2003. The institution had at that time only ten classrooms and the number of student was 185.

The college compound occupies an area of 2,350 square metres, a plot of terrain occupied by the Forest Department, Ministry of Agriculture. The JBD SSS was built by Pad & Co Company LTD to the tune of Rs 80 million. The full-fledged building was handed over to the Ministry of Education and Human Resources by the Ministry of Infrastructure on 13 November 2003. It was inaugurated by the President of the Republic, the Honorable Sir Anerood Jugnauth and in the presence of various Ministers namely: Education, Steve Obeegadoo, Infrastructure, Anil Kumar Bachoo and of Women's Rights, Mrs. M.A Navarre Marie, and Members of the National Assembly J.C. Barbier and J.C L.D Armanc.

In December 2010 the school which was previously known as the Bell Village SSS was renamed as James Burty David SSS in honor of the former Minister of the Government James Burty David, a man who dedicated his life to two passions: politics and education.

Infrastructure
 Computer rooms
 DC/DT workshops
 Art room
 Option Rooms
 Library
 Audiovisual rooms
 2 canteens

See also
 Education in Mauritius
 List of secondary schools in Mauritius

References 

Secondary schools in Mauritius
Educational institutions established in 2003
2003 establishments in Mauritius
Boys' schools in Mauritius